The Assassination of Mohamed Boudiaf took place on 29 June 1992. As Chairman of the High Council of Algeria, was killed by one of his own bodyguards, Lambarek Boumaarafi, presented officially as an Islamic fundamentalist, and a sympathiser of the Islamic Salvation Front (FIS), who acted alone. He was assassinated in Annaba while addressing a public meeting on June 29, 1992, which was later broadcast on national TV.

He received three bullets, two in the head and one in his back. He was president for only five months, after his return from exile in Morocco to rule over the HCE (High Council of State) that emerged as a constitutional alternative to the Islamic State declared by the FIS after winning 1991 first democratic elections in the country since its independence in 1962. His mission was to crush the FIS, stop the civil war and restore order.

Boudiaf was one of the few  veterans of the Algerian War still alive at the time. After Krim Belkacem, assassinated in Frankfurt 1970, and Mohamed Khider assassinated in Madrid in 1967, and Mohammed Seddik Benyahia the foreign minister assassinated on the Iran–Iraq border when working on a walk out from the First Gulf War.

The attack
The attack began with a grenade explosion on one side of the podium from where Boudiaf was giving his speech, which attracted the attention of Boudiaf and his bodyguards while another grenade was thrown under his chair. The two blasts were followed by a gunman dressed in the uniform of the elite police intervention unit who emerged from behind Boudiaf, and emptied his sub-machine gun into the President's back. The gunman and at least 40 other people were killed or injured in the attack. Among the wounded were the Minister of Industry and a top provincial official.

International circumstances
Boudiaf's assassination coincided with the Algerian state-owned oil company Sonatrach's launch in London of a first onshore leasing round in which it sought participation by foreign oil companies in opening up new production facilities in Algeria.  Oil prices rose on immediate fears that the killing of Boudiaf might trigger unrest that could hit production, but they fell back later in the day. Sources believe there may be a short-term disruption of exports from Algeria, but the country will have to sell oil eventually.

Iran and other members of fundamentalist Muslim governments praised the killing of the Algerian leader, while the United States, the Organization of African Unity,  and other western nations condemned it.  

The attack on Boudiaf was the Arab world's most dramatic political killing since Egyptian President Anwar Sadat was assassinated by Islamic fundamentalists in 1981.

See also
Algerian Civil War
Lambarek Boumaarafi
Assassination of Anwar Sadat

References

Algerian Civil War
Assassinations in Algeria
Boudiaf, Mohamed
June 1992 events in Africa
1992 murders in Algeria
Filmed assassinations